Pierre André Latreille (29 November 1762 – 6 February 1833) was a French zoologist, specialising in arthropods. Having trained as a Roman Catholic priest before the French Revolution, Latreille was imprisoned, and only regained his freedom after recognising a rare beetle species he found in the prison, Necrobia ruficollis.

His foresighted work on arthropod systematics and taxonomy gained him respect and accolades, including being asked to write the volume on arthropods for George Cuvier's monumental work, the only part not by Cuvier himself.

Latreille was considered the foremost entomologist of his time, and was described by one of his pupils as "the prince of entomologists".

Biography

Early life
Pierre André Latreille was born on 29 November 1762 in the town of Brive, then in the province of Limousin, as the illegitimate child of Jean Joseph Sahuguet d'Amarzit, général baron d'Espagnac, who never recognised him, and an unknown mother, who abandoned him at birth; the surname "Latreille" was formally granted to him in 1813, and derives from a nickname of unclear provenance. Latreille, effectively orphaned from his earliest age, but had influential protectors – first a physician, then a merchant from Brive, and later a baron  (after the baron's death), who brought him to Paris in 1778.

He studied initially in Brive and in Paris at the  attached to the University of Paris to become a priest. Despite being qualified to preach, Latreille later wrote that he had never carried out his functions as a minister, although for a few years he signed the letters he wrote "" ("the Reverend Latreille") or "" ("Latreille, Priest").

Even during his studies, Latreille had taken on an interest in natural history, visiting the  planted by Georges-Louis Leclerc, Comte de Buffon, and catching insects around Paris. He received lessons on botany from René Just Haüy, which brought him in contact with Jean-Baptiste Lamarck.

Necrobia ruficollis

Latreille failed to do so and was therefore imprisoned in November 1793 under threat of execution.

When the prison's doctor inspected the prisoners, he was surprised to find Latreille scrutinising a beetle on the dungeon floor. When Latreille explained that it was a rare insect, the physician was impressed, and sent the insect to a 15-year-old local naturalist, Jean Baptiste Bory de Saint-Vincent. Bory de St.-Vincent knew Latreille's work, and managed to obtain the release of Latreille and one of his cell-mates.  Latreille and Bory de Saint-Vincent remained life-long friends. The beetle had been described by Johan Christian Fabricius in 1775, but recognising it had saved Latreille from likely demise, as all the other inmates were dead within one month.

Thereafter, Latreille lived as a teacher and corresponded with various entomologists, including Fabricius. In 1796, and with Fabricius' encouragement, Latreille published his  at his own expense. He was briefly placed under house arrest in 1797, and his books were confiscated, but the influence of Georges Cuvier, Bernard Germain de Lacépède and Jean-Baptiste Lamarck (who all held chairs of zoology at the recently instituted ) succeeded in freeing Latreille. In 1798, Latreille was appointed to the Muséum, where he worked alongside Lamarck, curating the arthropod collections, and published a number of zoological works.

First Empire
In 1819, Latreille was elected as a member of the American Philosophical Society in Philadelphia. As Lamarck became blind, Latreille took on an increasing proportion of his teaching and research work. In 1829 he succeeded Lamarck as professor of entomology.

Later years

From 1824, Latreille's health deteriorated. He handed his lectures over to Jean Victoire Audouin and took on several assistants for his research work, including Amédée Louis Michel Lepeletier, Jean Guillaume Audinet-Serville and Félix Édouard Guérin-Méneville.

Latreille's wife became ill in 1830 and died in May of that year; the date of Latreille's marriage is unclear, and his request to be released from his vow of celibacy was never acknowledged. He resigned his position at the museum on 10 April 1832, in order to move to the country and thereby avoid the cholera epidemic. He returned to Paris in November, and died of bladder disease on 6 February 1833. He had no children but was survived by a niece whom he had adopted.

Commemoration
The  raised the money to pay for a monument to Latreille. This was erected over Latreille's grave at Père Lachaise Cemetery (39th division), and comprised a  obelisk with various inscriptions, including one to the beetle which had saved Latreille's life: "" ("Necrobia ruficollis, Latreille's saviour").

As testimony to the high esteem in which Latreille was held, many books were dedicated to him, and up to 163 species were named in his honour between 1798 and 1850. Taxa commemorating Latreille include:

 Lumbrineris latreilli Audouin & H. Milne-Edwards, 1833
 Cecrops latreillii Leach, 1816
 Apseudes latreillii (H. Milne-Edwards, 1828)
 Orbinia latreillii (Audouin & H. Milne-Edwards, 1833)
 Latreillia Roux, 1830
 Cilicaea latreillei Leach, 1818
 Bittium latreillii (Payraudeau, 1826)
 Macrophthalmus latreillei (Desmarest, 1822)
 Eurypodius latreillei Guérin, 1828
 Sphex latreillei Lepeletier de Saint Fargeau, 1831

Work

Latreille produced a significant body of scientific work, extending across several fields.

Taxonomy and systematics
Latreille was significant as the first person to attempt a natural classification of the arthropods. His "eclectic method" of systematics incorporated evidence from all available characters without assuming a pre-defined goal; Latreille repeatedly dismissed anthropocentrism and teleology.

As well as many species and countless genera, the names of many higher taxa are also attributable to Latreille, including Thysanura, Siphonaptera, Pycnogonida, Ostracoda, Stomatopoda, Decapoda, Amphipoda, Isopoda, Xiphosura, Melipona and Myriapoda.

Typification
Although Latreille named many species, his primary interest was in describing genera. He introduced the concept of the "type species", a species to which the name of a genus is firmly attached. Similarly, he favoured the method of naming families after one of the constituent genera, rather than some defining feature of the group, implicitly designating a type genus for the family.

References

External links

 Works by Pierre André Latreille at the Biodiversity Heritage Library

1762 births
1833 deaths
French zoologists
French taxonomists
French arachnologists
French carcinologists
French entomologists
Hymenopterists
People from Brive-la-Gaillarde
University of Paris alumni
Chevaliers of the Légion d'honneur
Members of the French Academy of Sciences
Members of the Royal Swedish Academy of Sciences
French Roman Catholics
Catholic clergy scientists
Burials at Père Lachaise Cemetery
18th-century French scientists
19th-century French scientists
18th-century French zoologists
19th-century French zoologists
Articles containing video clips
National Museum of Natural History (France) people